The following is an alphabetical list of articles related to the U.S. state of Illinois.

0–9 

.il.us – Internet second-level domain for the state of Illinois
21st state to join the United States of America

A
Adjacent states

Airports in Illinois
Amusement parks in Illinois
Aquaria in Illinois
commons:Category:Aquaria in Illinois
Arboreta in Illinois
commons:Category:Arboreta in Illinois
Archaeological sites in Illinois
commons:Category:Archaeological sites in Illinois
Area codes in Illinois
Art museums and galleries in Illinois
commons:Category:Art museums and galleries in Illinois
Astronomical observatories in Illinois
commons:Category:Astronomical observatories in Illinois
Attorney General of the State of Illinois

B
Beaches of Illinois
commons:Category:Beaches of Illinois
Biflex Products Corporation
Big bluestem
Bluegill
Blueprint for Disaster: The Unraveling of Chicago Public Housing
Botanical gardens in Illinois
commons:Category:Botanical gardens in Illinois
Breweries in Illinois
Buildings in Illinois
commons:Category:Buildings in Chicago
commons:Category:Buildings in Illinois

C

Capitol of the State of Illinois
commons:Category:Illinois State Capitol
Cardinal (bird)
Casinos in Illinois
Caves of Illinois
commons:Category:Caves of Illinois
Census statistical areas of Illinois
Center for Labor and Community Research
Chicago
Chicago Intellectual Property Alliance
Chicago metropolitan area
Cities in Illinois
commons:Category:Cities in Illinois

Climate of Illinois
:Category:Climate of Illinois
commons:Category:Climate of Illinois
Climate change in Illinois
Colleges and universities in Illinois
commons:Category:Universities and colleges in Illinois
Communications in Illinois
commons:Category:Communications in Illinois
Companies in Illinois
:Category:Companies based in Illinois
Congressional districts of Illinois
Constitution of the State of Illinois
Convention centers in Illinois
commons:Category:Convention centers in Illinois
 The 102 counties of the state of Illinois
commons:Category:Counties in Illinois
Culture of Illinois
commons:Category:Illinois culture

D
Demographics of Chicago
Demographics of Illinois
:Category:Demographics of Illinois
Dunn Fellowship                                                                    
(delicate)

E
Economy of Illinois
:Category:Economy of Illinois
commons:Category:Economy of Illinois
Education in Illinois
:Category:Education in Illinois
commons:Category:Education in Illinois
Elections in the State of Illinois
commons:Category:Illinois elections
Environment of Illinois
commons:Category:Environment of Illinois

F

Festivals in Illinois
commons:Category:Festivals in Illinois
Flag of the State of Illinois
Fluorite
Forts in Illinois
:Category:Forts in Illinois
commons:Category:Forts in Illinois

G

Geography of Illinois
:Category:Geography of Illinois
commons:Category:Geography of Illinois
Geology of Illinois
:Category:Geology of Illinois
commons:Category:Geology of Illinois
Ghost towns in Illinois
:Category:Ghost towns in Illinois
commons:Category:Ghost towns in Illinois
Golf clubs and courses in Illinois
Government of the State of Illinois website
:Category:Government of Illinois
commons:Category:Government of Illinois
Governor of the State of Illinois
List of governors of Illinois
Great Seal of the State of Illinois
Gun laws in Illinois

H
Heritage railroads in Illinois
commons:Category:Heritage railroads in Illinois
High schools of Illinois
Higher education in Illinois
Highway routes in Illinois
Hiking trails in Illinois
commons:Category:Hiking trails in Illinois
History of Illinois
Outline of Illinois history
:Category:History of Illinois
commons:Category:History of Illinois
Hospitals in Illinois
Houlihan Smith & Company
House of Representatives of the State of Illinois

I
IL – United States Postal Service postal code for the state of Illinois
Illinois website
:Category:Illinois
commons:Category:Illinois
commons:Category:Maps of Illinois
Illinois Clean Jobs Bill
Illinois Fair Tax
Illinois Hispanic Chamber of Commerce
Illinois Library Records Confidentiality Act
Illinois Northern Railroad
Illinois Prairie Community Foundation
Illinois River
Illinois Section American Water Works Association
Illinois Soil Nitrogen Test
Illinois State Capitol
Illinois State Police
Illinois Structural Health Monitoring Project
Illinois Trade Association
Illinois wiretapping law
Images of Illinois
commons:Category:Illinois
Islands in Illinois

J

K
Kabalas, band from the Quad Cities
Kaskaskia, Illinois, first territorial and state capital 1809-1820

L
Lakes in Illinois
Lake Michigan
:Category:Lakes of Illinois
commons:Category:Lakes of Illinois
Landmarks in Illinois
commons:Category:Landmarks in Illinois
Law of Illinois
Lieutenant Governor of the State of Illinois
Lists related to the state of Illinois:
List of airports in Illinois
List of breweries in Illinois
List of census-designated places in Illinois
List of census statistical areas in Illinois
List of cities in Illinois
List of colleges and universities in Illinois
List of companies in Illinois
List of United States congressional districts in Illinois
List of counties in Illinois
List of dams and reservoirs in Illinois
List of forts in Illinois
List of ghost towns in Illinois
List of governors of Illinois
List of high schools in Illinois
List of highway routes in Illinois
List of hospitals in Illinois
List of individuals executed in Illinois
List of islands in Illinois
List of lakes in Illinois
List of law enforcement agencies in Illinois
List of lieutenant governors of Illinois
List of United States military bases in Illinois
List of museums in Illinois
List of National Historic Landmarks in Illinois
List of newspapers in Illinois
List of people from Illinois
List of power stations in Illinois
List of precincts in Illinois
List of professional sports teams in Illinois
List of radio stations in Illinois
List of railroads in Illinois
National Register of Historic Places listings in Illinois
List of rivers of Illinois
List of school districts in Illinois
List of state forests in Illinois
List of state parks in Illinois
List of state prisons in Illinois
List of symbols of the State of Illinois
List of telephone area codes in Illinois
List of television stations in Illinois
List of United States congressional delegations from Illinois
List of United States congressional districts in Illinois
List of United States representatives from Illinois
List of United States senators from Illinois
List of watersheds in Illinois

M
Maps of Illinois
commons:Category:Maps of Illinois
Mass media in Illinois
Mississippi River
Monarch butterfly
Monuments and memorials in Illinois
commons:Category:Monuments and memorials in Illinois
Museums in Illinois
:Category:Museums in Illinois
commons:Category:Museums in Illinois
Music of Illinois
commons:Category:Music of Illinois
:Category:Musical groups from Illinois
:Category:Musicians from Illinois

N
National Forests of Illinois
commons:Category:National Forests of Illinois
Natural gas pipelines in Illinois
Natural history of Illinois
commons:Category:Natural history of Illinois
Nature centers in Illinois
commons:Category:Nature centers in Illinois
Newspapers of Illinois
Northern Illinois Bluegrass Association
Northern Illinois Fire Sprinkler Advisory Board
Northwest Territory, (1787–1800)-1803

O
Ohio River
Outdoor sculptures in Illinois
commons:Category:Outdoor sculptures in Illinois

P
People from Illinois
:Category:People from Illinois
commons:Category:People from Illinois
:Category:People by city in Illinois
:Category:People by county in Illinois
:Category:People from Illinois by occupation
Politics of Illinois
:Category:Politics of Illinois
commons:Category:Politics of Illinois
Professional sports teams in Illinois
Protected areas of Illinois
commons:Category:Protected areas of Illinois

Q
Quad Cities

R
Radio stations in Illinois
Railroad museums in Illinois
commons:Category:Railroad museums in Illinois
Railroads in Illinois
National Register of Historic Places listings in Illinois
commons:Category:Registered Historic Places in Illinois
Religion in Illinois
:Category:Religion in Illinois
commons:Category:Religion in Illinois
List of rivers of Illinois
commons:Category:Rivers of Illinois
Roller coasters in Illinois
commons:Category:Roller coasters in Illinois

S
School districts of Illinois
Scouting in Illinois
Senate of the State of Illinois
Settlements in Illinois
Cities in Illinois
Towns in Illinois
Villages in Illinois
Townships in Illinois
Census Designated Places in Illinois
Other unincorporated communities in Illinois
List of ghost towns in Illinois
Solar power in Illinois
Springfield, Illinois, state capital since 1839
Sports in Illinois
:Category:Sports in Illinois
commons:Category:Sports in Illinois
:Category:Sports venues in Illinois
commons:Category:Sports venues in Illinois
State Capitol of Illinois
State of Illinois website
Constitution of the State of Illinois
Government of the State of Illinois
:Category:Government of Illinois
commons:Category:Government of Illinois
Executive branch of the government of the State of Illinois
Governor of the State of Illinois
Legislative branch of the government of the State of Illinois
Legislature of the State of Illinois
Senate of the State of Illinois
House of Representatives of the State of Illinois
Judicial branch of the government of the State of Illinois
Supreme Court of Illinois
State parks of Illinois
commons:Category:State parks of Illinois
State Police of Illinois
State prisons of Illinois
Structures in Illinois
commons:Category: Buildings and structures in Illinois
Sucker State, an old nickname for Illinois
Supreme Court of Illinois
Symbols of the State of Illinois
:Category:Symbols of Illinois
commons:Category:Symbols of Illinois

T
Telecommunications in Illinois
commons:Category:Communications in Illinois
Telephone area codes in Illinois
Television shows set in Illinois
Television stations in Illinois
Territory Northwest of the River Ohio, (1787–1800)-1803
Illinois Territory, 1809–1818
Indiana Territory, (1800–1809)-1816
Theatres in Illinois
commons:Category:Theatres in Illinois
Tourism in Illinois website
commons:Category:Tourism in Illinois
Transportation in Illinois
:Category:Transportation in Illinois
commons:Category:Transport in Illinois
Illinois Treasurer
Tullimonstrum gregarium

U
United States of America
States of the United States of America
United States census statistical areas of Illinois
United States congressional delegations from Illinois
United States congressional districts in Illinois
United States Court of Appeals for the Seventh Circuit
United States District Court for the Central District of Illinois
United States District Court for the Northern District of Illinois
United States District Court for the Southern District of Illinois
United States representatives from Illinois
United States senators from Illinois
Universities and colleges in Illinois
commons:Category:Universities and colleges in Illinois
US-IL – ISO 3166-2:US region code for the State of Illinois
USS Illinois (BB-7)

V
Vandalia, Illinois, state capital 1820-1839
Viola sororia

W
War Lords
Water parks in Illinois
Watersheds in Illinois
White oak
White-tailed deer
Wikimedia Foundation
Wikimedia Commons:Category:Illinois
commons:Category:Maps of Illinois
Wikinews:Category:Illinois
Wikinews:Portal:Illinois
Wikipedia Category:Illinois
Wikipedia Portal:Illinois
Wikipedia:WikiProject Illinois
:Category:WikiProject Illinois articles
Wikipedia:WikiProject Illinois/Participants
Wind power in Illinois

X

Y

Z
Zoos in Illinois
commons:Category:Zoos in Illinois

See also

Topic overview:
Illinois
Outline of Illinois

Illinois
 
Illinois